Nenad Jovanović (born 12 May 1988) is a Serbian football midfielder who plays for OFK Beograd.

References

External links
 
 Nenad Jovanović stats at utakmica.rs 
 

1988 births
Living people
Footballers from Belgrade
Association football midfielders
Serbian footballers
FK Makedonija Gjorče Petrov players
FK Napredok players
KF Shkëndija players
OFK Petrovac players
FK BSK Borča players
FK Mačva Šabac players
FK Inđija players
OFK Žarkovo players
OFK Beograd players
Serbian First League players
Serbian SuperLiga players
Montenegrin First League players
Serbian expatriate footballers
Expatriate footballers in North Macedonia
Serbian expatriate sportspeople in North Macedonia
Expatriate footballers in Montenegro
Serbian expatriate sportspeople in Montenegro